The Dlugov assault rifle (автомат Длугова) was a prototype assault rifle of Soviet origin. The weapon used a blowback operation and was chambered in the 7.62×39mm round. It was proposed as an alternative to the gas operated AK-47, but the Dlugov turned out ineffective and was rejected.

See also
 FAMAS
 TKB-517
 List of assault rifles

References

7.62×39mm assault rifles
Trial and research firearms of the Soviet Union